Nadolny is a surname of Slavic-language origin. It may refer to:

  (1905–1968), German novelist
  (1917–2004), German novelist
  (born 1960), German actor, comedy-artist and writer
 Rudolf Nadolny (1873–1953), German diplomat
 Sten Nadolny (born 1942), German novelist, son of Burkhard and Isabella Nadolny
 Stephanie Nadolny (born 1971), American voice-over artist

See also
 

Polish-language surnames